In mathematics, a braided Hopf algebra is a Hopf algebra in a braided monoidal category. The most common braided Hopf algebras are objects in a Yetter–Drinfeld category of a Hopf algebra H, particularly the Nichols algebra of a braided vector space in that category.

The notion should not be confused with quasitriangular Hopf algebra.

Definition 

Let H be a Hopf algebra over a field k, and assume that the antipode of H is bijective. A Yetter–Drinfeld module R over H is called a braided bialgebra in the Yetter–Drinfeld category  if
  is a unital associative algebra, where the multiplication map  and the unit  are maps of Yetter–Drinfeld modules,
 
Here c is the canonical braiding in the Yetter–Drinfeld category .

  for all 

where  in slightly modified Sweedler notation – a change of notation is performed in order to avoid confusion in Radford's biproduct below.

Examples 

 Any Hopf algebra is also a braided Hopf algebra over 
 A super Hopf algebra is nothing but a braided Hopf algebra over the group algebra .
 The tensor algebra  of a Yetter–Drinfeld module  is always a braided Hopf algebra.
                                                                              
The counit  then satisfies the equation  for all 
They take the role of quantum Borel algebras in the classification of pointed Hopf algebras, analogously to the classical Lie algebra case.

Radford's biproduct 

For any braided Hopf algebra R in  there exists a natural Hopf algebra  which contains R as a subalgebra and H as a Hopf subalgebra. It is called  Radford's biproduct, named after its discoverer, the Hopf algebraist David Radford. It was rediscovered by Shahn Majid, who called it bosonization.

As a vector space,  is just .
 

 

References 

 Andruskiewitsch, Nicolás and Schneider, Hans-Jürgen, Pointed Hopf algebras,  New directions in Hopf algebras,  1–68, Math. Sci. Res. Inst. Publ., 43, Cambridge Univ. Press, Cambridge, 2002.

Hopf algebras